NGC 6834 is a young open cluster of stars located about 10,850 light years from the Sun in the constellation Cygnus. It was discovered on July 17, 1784 by Anglo-German astronomer William Herschel. The cluster has a visual magnitude of 7.8, which is dimmed by 2.1 magnitudes due to interstellar dust.

It has about 260 members and an age of approximately 65 million years, although estimates range from 50 to 80 million. A total of fifteen B-type variable stars have been detected in the cluster with four Be stars. Five of the cluster members show hydrogen alpha emission, including a γ Cas and two λ Eri variables.

References

External links
 

6834
Open clusters
Cygnus (constellation)